Belo River may refer to:

Brazil
 Belo River (Iguazu River tributary), Paraná, Brazil
 Belo River (Ivaí River tributary), Paraná, Brazil